Manchuria is an exonym for a region of northeast Asia.

Manchuria may also refer to:
 The traditional homelands of the Jurchens
 The traditional homelands of the Manchus
 Later Jin (1616–1636), the Manchu state prior to the establishment of the Qing Empire
 Manchukuo, the Manchu puppet state of Imperial Japan from 1932 to 1945
 Northeast China ("Inner Manchuria"), the three northeasternmost provinces of the People's Republic of China
 Outer Manchuria, the Qing territories ceded to Russia in the 1850s
 Manchuria Station, a stopping point on the Trans-Siberian Railway now known as Manzhouli

See also
 Jurchen Jin dynasty
 Manchu (disambiguation)
 Manchuria under Yuan, Ming, and Qing rule
 Manchurian (disambiguation)
 Manchurians (disambiguation)